The U.S. Supreme Court has issued numerous rulings regarding mental health and how society treats and regards the mentally ill. While some rulings applied very narrowly, perhaps to only one individual, other cases have had great influence over wide areas.

Disability

Criminal competency

Death penalty

Insanity

Testimony

Addictions

Right to treatment

Right to refuse treatment

Civil commitment

References

History of the Death Penalty, University of Alaska Anchorage, Justice Center

See also
Capital punishment in the United States
Participation of medical professionals in American executions

Mental health
Mental health law in the United States